Assaat Datuk Mudo (18 September 1904 – 16 June 1976), known as Mr. Assaat, was born in Banuhampu, Agam, West Sumatra, Dutch East Indies (now Indonesia). He was the only President of the Yogyakarta-based Republic of Indonesia before it became the part of the United States of Indonesia, and was in office from December 1949 until August 1950. He and a number of Indonesia founders, fought for the independence of Indonesia from the Dutch.

Education
His early education was in Islamic schools and Dutch schools in Indonesia. He studied Islam in Adabiah, Padang and also in MULO (Meer Uitgebreid Lager Onderwijs). And next to School tot Opleiding van Inlandsche Artsen in Batavia (now in Jakarta). He completed his education in the Netherlands school with the title Meester in de Rechten (Bachelor of Law).

Political Activities

His activities as a politician started in Jong Sumatranen Bond. Afterwards, he joined Perhimpunan Pemuda Indonesia. While in the Rechts Hoge School'' his professors disliked Assat's political activities and Assaat failed his exams. He then joined the Indonesia Party (Partindo) with Adnan Kapau Gani, Adam Malik, and Amir Sjarifoeddin. After Indonesian independence, he was elected as head of the Central Indonesian National Committee (KNIP) until Sukarno was captured by the Dutch. Assaat was named President of the Provisional Government of Indonesia until Sukarno's return. In December 1948, the Dutch launched their second "Police Action" and focused their attack on Yogyakarta. Assaat was captured by the Dutch army and sent to exile on Bangka Island along with other nationalist leaders.

After his release, he moved to Jakarta where he became a member of the Provisional People's Representative Council. During Natsir's prime ministership, Assaat was appointed the Minister of Home Affairs. During his time as an influential figure in Indonesian politics Assaat became known for his extremist views against the ethnic Chinese minority of Indonesia. A movement called the "Assaat Movement" began calling for the expulsion of Chinese from Indonesia. On 19 March 1956, during an opening speech for the National Congress of Indonesian Importers Assaat stated "The Chinese as an exclusive group refuse other group to enter, specially in the economy. They were so exclusive that in their practice they become monopolistic." and called for the government to create legislation that would economically benefit the 'pribumi' (non-Chinese Indonesian). In 1959, a presidential decree (PP 10 1959) came into effect. The decree stated that all 'Foreign citizens' in rural areas were to be forcibly 'relocated' to urban areas. The decree oversaw an exodus of a large population of ethnic Chinese (that had been in Indonesia for generations) out of Indonesia.

During the late 1950s, Assaat began to openly criticize Sukarno before moving to his home island of Sumatera to join a short-lived, CIA-backed rebellion of junior officers of the Indonesian army which had called itself the Revolutionary Government of the Republic of Indonesia. Once the rebels were defeated, Assaat was captured, labelled a traitor and jailed for his involvement.

References

External links
 Mr. Assaat

1904 births
1976 deaths
Minangkabau people
People from Agam Regency
Presidents of Indonesia
Indonesian prisoners and detainees
Prisoners and detainees of Indonesia
Interior ministers of Indonesia